Banjski Orešac is a village in the municipality of Knjaževac, Serbia. According to the 2002 census, the village has a population of 96 people.

Population
According to census data, the population has been in a decline since at least 1948:

References

Populated places in Zaječar District